Tod Long (born December 18, 1970, in Oklahoma City, Oklahoma) is an American former sprinter.

References

1970 births
Living people
American male sprinters
Oklahoma Sooners men's track and field athletes
World Athletics Indoor Championships winners